Sun FM is a British radio station serving the City of Sunderland.

Sun FM may also refer to:

 Sun FM (Sri Lanka), an English language radio station based in Sri Lanka
 CICF-FM, a Canadian radio station, broadcasting at 105.7 FM in Vernon, British Columbia, using the on-air branding as 105.7 Sun FM
 CHSU-FM, a Canadian radio station, broadcasting at 99.9 FM in Kelowna, British Columbia, using the on-air branding as 99.9 Sun FM
 CJMG-FM, a Canadian radio station, broadcasting at 97.1 FM in Penticton, British Columbia, using the on-air branding as 97.1 Sun FM
 CHRX-FM, a Canadian radio station, broadcasting at 98.5 FM in generally Fort St. John, British Columbia, using the on-air branding as 98.5 Sun FM
 CKUL-FM, a Canadian radio station, formerly known as 96.5 Sun FM, but now as 96.5 Kool FM, being broadcast in Halifax, Nova Scotia
 CFPW-FM, a Canadian radio station, broadcasting at 95.7 FM in Powell River, British Columbia, using the on-air branding as 95.7 Sun FM
 CKBL-FM, a Canadian radio station in Saskatoon, Saskatchewan, formerly known as 92.9 Sun FM
 WAIL, an American radio station, broadcasting as 99.5 FM in Key West, Florida, using the on-air branding as Sun 99.5
 Suryan FM, a radio station known as the Sun Network
 Sun FM (New Zealand), a New Zealand Māori radio station
 one of several Australia radio stations included in the list of radio stations in Australia